Raymond Radiguet (18 June 1903 – 12 December 1923) was a French novelist and poet whose two novels were noted for their explicit themes, and unique style and tone.

Early life
Radiguet was born in Saint-Maur, Val-de-Marne, close to Paris, the son of a caricaturist. In 1917, he moved to the city. Soon he would drop out of the Lycée Charlemagne, where he studied, in order to pursue his interests in journalism and literature.

Career
In early 1923, Radiguet published his first and most famous novel, Le Diable au corps (The Devil in the Flesh). The story of a young married woman who has an affair with a 16-year-old boy while her husband is away fighting at the front provoked scandal in a country that had just been through World War I. Though Radiguet denied it, it was established later that the story was in large part autobiographical.

His second novel, Le bal du Comte d'Orgel (The Ball of Count Orgel), also dealing with adultery, was only published posthumously in 1924, and also proved controversial.

In addition to his two novels, Radiguet's works include a few poetry volumes and a play.

Associations
He associated himself with the Modernist set, befriending Pablo Picasso, Max Jacob, Jean Hugo, Juan Gris and especially Jean Cocteau, who became his mentor. Radiguet also had several well-documented relationships with women. An anecdote told by Ernest Hemingway has an enraged Cocteau charging Radiguet (known in the Parisian literary circles as "Monsieur Bébé" – Mister Baby) with decadence for his tryst with a female model: "Bébé est vicieuse. Il aime les femmes." ("Baby is depraved. He likes women." [Note the use of the feminine adjective.]) Radiguet, Hemingway implies, employed his sexuality to advance his career: being a writer "who knew how to make his career not only with his pen but with his pencil."

Literary reactions
In 1945, Steadman and Blake write that admirers of his first novel "include the most discriminating of critics." Aldous Huxley is quoted as declaring that Radiguet had attained the literary control that others required a long career to reach. François Mauriac said that Le Diable au corps is "unretouched and seems shocking, but nothing so resembles cynicism as clairvoyance. No adolescent before Radiguet has delivered to us the secret of that age: we have all falsified it."

Death
On 12 December 1923, Radiguet died at age 20 in Paris of typhoid fever, which he contracted after a trip he took with Cocteau.  Cocteau, in an interview with The Paris Review, stated that Radiguet had told him three days before his death that, "In three days, I am going to be shot by the soldiers of God." In reaction to this death Francis Poulenc wrote, "For two days I was unable to do anything, I was so stunned".

In her 1932 memoir, Laughing Torso, British artist Nina Hamnett describes Radiguet's funeral: 
"The church was crowded with people. In the pew in front of us was the negro band from Le Boeuf sur le Toit.  Picasso was there, Brâncuși and so many celebrated people that I cannot remember their names. Radiguet's death was a terrible shock to everyone. Coco Chanel, the celebrated dressmaker, arranged the funeral. It was most wonderfully done. Cocteau was too ill to come." ... " Cocteau was terribly upset and could not see anyone for weeks afterwards. I wrote to him in February and asked him if I could come and see him. He wrote me a charming letter:

25 fevrier 1924CHERE NINAJe suis toujours malade et sans courage.Telephonez un matin".De coeur,JEAN COCTEAU

English Translation

25 February 1924DEAR NINAI am still sick and without courage. Call me in the morning.With heart,JEAN COCTEAU

Bibliography
 Les Joues en feu (1920) – poetry, translated by Alan Stone as Cheeks on Fire: Collected Poems
 Devoirs de vacances (1921) – poetry (English translation Holiday Homework)
 Les Pelican (1921) – drama, translated by Michael Benedikt and George Wellworth as The Pelicans
 Le Diable au corps (1923) – novel, translated by Kay Boyle as The Devil in the Flesh
 Le Bal du comte d'Orgel (1924) – novel, translated by Malcolm Cowley as The Count's Ball
 Oeuvres completes (1952) – translated as Complete Works
 Regle du jeu (1957) – translated as Game Rule
 Vers Libres & Jeux Innocents, Le Livre a Venir (1988) – translated as About Free & Games Innocents, The Book is Coming

Film adaptations
In 1947, Claude Autant-Lara released his film Le diable au corps, based on Radiguet's novel, and starring Gérard Philipe. Coming just after World War II, the movie caused controversy in its turn. Among the other cinematic versions of Radiguet's story, the heavily adapted version by Marco Bellocchio, Il diavolo in corpo (1986), was notable as being among the first mainstream films to show unsimulated sex.

In 1970, Le Bal du compte d'Orgel was adapted into a film, starring Jean-Claude Brialy as Le comte Anne d'Orgel. It was the last movie directed by Marc Allégret, who, like Radiguet, had once fallen under the spell of Cocteau.

In popular culture 
The artist David Cilnius has dedicated his lyric/poem Whip the poor will to the writer's premature death, quoting Radiguet's last words.

References

Further reading
 Ivry, Benjamin (1996). Francis Poulenc. Phaidon Press Limited. 
 Steadman, Christina and Blake, William: Modern Women in Love, Garden City Publishing Co., New York, 1947 (first ed. Dryden Press, New York City, 1945) p. 3

External links

1903 births
1923 deaths
People from Saint-Maur-des-Fossés
Burials at Père Lachaise Cemetery
20th-century French novelists
French male novelists
20th-century French male writers